The Missouri State Museum is Missouri's showpiece museum. It was founded in 1919 and is located in Jefferson City, Missouri, inside the state capitol on the ground floor of the building.

The museum's mission is to explore Missouri's history and resources to discover connections that inspire the present and enrich the future. Visitors will find a variety of cultural and natural history exhibits including temporary exhibits, stationary exhibits, traveling exhibits, and hands-on and audio interactive.  The museum offers a variety of free in-house public programming, outreach programming and traveling exhibits geared toward all ages and audiences. The museum has over 30,000 artifacts in its collection, including the largest collections of Missouri Civil War battle flags and World War I flags.

The history wing of the museum was originally the only part of the museum and is now in the eastern wing of the capitol building. In 1921, the Missouri Resources Museum was founded and placed in the wing directly opposite the state museum in the west wing of the capitol. The two merged in 1923 to form the Missouri State Museum. The museum was controlled by a variety of state agencies until 1978. In that year the Missouri Department of Natural Resources (DNR) took control of the museum where it has remained ever since. It is now part of DNR's Division of State Parks. The museum staff also provides tours of the capitol building itself.

External links
 http://www.missouristatemuseum.com
 http://www.dnr.mo.gov/

References 

History museums in Missouri
Museums in Jefferson City, Missouri
Natural history museums in Missouri